Shchekino is a rural locality (a village) in Chushevitskoye Rural Settlement, Verkhovazhsky District, Vologda Oblast, Russia. The population was 57 as of 2002.

Geography 
Shchekino is located 41 km southwest of Verkhovazhye (the district's administrative centre) by road. Payus is the nearest rural locality.

References 

Rural localities in Verkhovazhsky District